Jack Benedick (1943 – 19 March 2013) was an American para-alpine skier. He represented the United States at the 1980 Winter Paralympics in Geilo, Norway and at the 1984 Winter Paralympics in Innsbruck, Austria. He won the silver medal in the men's alpine combination LW3 event at the 1984 Winter Paralympics. He was inducted in the U.S. Ski & Snowboard Hall of Fame in 2009.

In 1969, he lost both his legs in Vietnam. In 2006, he was the recipient of one of the Paralympic Order awards of 2005. He died on 19 March 2013.

See also 
 List of Paralympic medalists in alpine skiing

References

External links 
 

1943 births
2013 deaths
American male alpine skiers
Paralympic alpine skiers of the United States
Alpine skiers at the 1980 Winter Paralympics
Alpine skiers at the 1984 Winter Paralympics
Medalists at the 1984 Winter Paralympics
Paralympic silver medalists for the United States
Place of birth missing
Recipients of the Paralympic Order
American amputees
American military personnel of the Vietnam War